Arias is a Spanish surname.

Notable individuals with the surname include:
 Arias Gonzalo (born 1020) Spanish aristocrat and knight.
 Alberto Árias (born 1983), Dominican professional baseball pitcher 
 Alex Arias, former MLB infielder
 Ana Claudia Arias (born 1973), American physicist
 Antonio Arias Bernal (1913-1960), Mexican artist and political cartoonist for United States Government
 Antonio Arias (disambiguation), several people
 Arnulfo Arias (1901–1988), Panamanian politician, doctor, writer and president of Panama
 Aurora Arias (born 1962), Dominican Republican writer, journalist and astrologer
 Carlos Arias (disambiguation), several people
 Clotilde Arias (1901–1959), Peruvian composer
 Diego Arias (born 1985), Colombian footballer
 Esteban Arias (born 1982), American soccer player of Mexican heritage
 Federico Arias (born 1979), former Argentine footballer
 Gabriel Arias (shortstop) (born 2000), Venezuelan baseball player
 George Arias (born 1972), former baseball player in Major League Baseball and Nippon Professional Baseball
 Jimmy Arias (born 1964), former tennis touring professional player from the United States
 Julien Arias (born 1983), French rugby union footballer
 Junior Arias (born 1993), Uruguayan footballer
 Lola Arias (born 1976), Argentine actress, writer, and director
 Luis Carlos Arias (born 1985), Colombian footballer
 Matthew Arias (born 1991), Mexican-American musician and picture editor
 Maximiliano Arias (born 1988), Uruguayan footballer
 Moisés Arias (born 1994), American actor
 Óscar Arias (born 1940), former President of Costa Rica
 Ramón Arias (born 1992), Uruguayan footballer
 Raul Arias (born 1959), former Mexican first division footballer
 Ricardo Arias (politician) (born 1912), former President of Panama
 Ricardo Arias Calderón (born 1933), Panamanian politician
 Ricardo Arias (footballer) (born 1957), Spanish retired footballer who played as a defender for Valencia CF
 Santiago Arias (born 1992), Colombian footballer
 Wellington Arias (born 1991), Dominican amateur lightweight boxer
 Yosimar Arias (born 1986), Costa Rican footballer
 Maluma (Juan Luis Londoño Árias), Colombian singer

See also 

 Aria (name)
 Aria (disambiguation)